The men's ice hockey tournament at the 1988 Winter Olympics in Calgary, Alberta, Canada, was the 16th Olympic Championship. The Soviet Union won its seventh gold medal. The silver medal was won by Finland, marking its first ever Olympic ice hockey medal. Sweden won the bronze medal. Games were held in the Olympic Saddledome, the Stampede Corral, and Father David Bauer Olympic Arena. This is so far the only Olympic tournament held on North American soil that was not won by either Canada or United States.

The IIHF did not run a championship in Olympic years at this time. Nations that did not participate in the Calgary Olympics were invited to compete in the final Thayer Tutt Trophy.

Background
The Canadian team had defeated the favoured Soviets twice in the run-up to the Olympics and was considered a gold medal contender for the first time since 1968. The first win over the Soviet squad was particularly significant as it happened in the annual Izvestia tournament which was held in 1987 in Moscow and was considered a final shot before the Olympics. Unfortunately for the Canadians, these victories backfired as the Soviets prepared better for the Olympic tournament and won in a head-to-head match 5–0.

Tournament changes 
The Calgary Organizing Committee (OCO'88) sought a revamped ice hockey tournament for the Games, which included more games played between the more competitive teams. In previous Olympic tournaments the top four teams advanced from the first round robin stage, Calgary intended to instead have six teams advance, which had the effect of increasing the total number of ice hockey games in the Olympics from 36 to 42. While the International Olympic Committee (IOC) was able to convince the IIHF to allow OCO'88 to schedule games after the match draws had occurred to ensure premier matches were held in the higher capacity Olympic Saddledome, the IIHF remained reluctant to increase the number of games noting it would extend the break for European leagues with players participating. Eventually the IIHF and IOC agreed to the increased number of games with some changes to financial payments to the IIHF.

Doping 
Polish ice-hockey player Jarosław Morawiecki tested positive for the banned substance Testosterone during the Games. The 23 year old centre, who was considered Poland's best player, exceeded the allowable limit of testosterone in random testing after a match which saw Poland defeat France 6–2. Polish coach Leszek Lejczyk claimed Morawiecki was deliberately drugged for political reasons.

The International Ice Hockey Federation (IIHF) banned Morawiecki from competition for 18 months and invalidated Poland's victory in the France match. Poland finished 5th of 6th in the tournament Group A standings.

Medalists

Qualification
The top eleven nations from the 1987 World Championships (eight from pool A, top three from pool B) qualified directly, while the twelfth ranked nation had to play off against the winner of that year's pool C. France beat Japan 8 goals to 6.
April 6, 1987, West Germany
France 7–3 Japan
April 7, 1987, West Germany
France 1–3 Japan

First round

Group A

February 14
Canada 1–0 Poland
Sweden 13–2 France
Switzerland 2–1 Finland
February 16
Canada 4–2 Switzerland
Sweden 1–1 Poland
Finland 10–1 France
February 18
Finland 3–1 Canada
Poland 6–2 France*
Sweden 4–2 Switzerland
February 20
Canada 9–5 France
Finland 3–3 Sweden
Switzerland 4–1 Poland
February 22
Canada 2–2 Sweden
Finland 5–1 Poland
Switzerland 9–0 France

* The Polish team was stripped of its victory after Jarosław Morawiecki tested positive for testosterone. France was recorded as having a 2-nil win, but received no points in the standings.

Group B

 February 13
 West Germany 2–1 Czechoslovakia
 Soviet Union 5–0 Norway
 USA 10–6 Austria
 February 15
 West Germany 7–3 Norway
 Soviet Union 8–1 Austria
 Czechoslovakia 7–5 USA
 February 17
 Austria 1–3 West Germany
 Czechoslovakia 10–1 Norway
 Soviet Union 7–5 USA
 February 19
 Austria 0–4 Czechoslovakia
 West Germany 3–6 Soviet Union
 USA 6–3 Norway
 February 21
 Soviet Union 6–1 Czechoslovakia
 Austria 4–4 Norway
 West Germany 4–1 USA

Final round
The top three teams from each group play the top three teams from the other group once. Points from previous games against their own group carry over, excluding teams who failed to make the medal round. First place team wins gold, second silver and third bronze.

February 24
 Soviet Union 5–0 Canada
 Sweden 6–2 Czechoslovakia
 Finland 8–0 West Germany
February 26
 Canada 8–1 West Germany
 Czechoslovakia 5–2 Finland
 Soviet Union 7–1 Sweden
February 27
 Canada 6–3 Czechoslovakia
February 28
 Sweden 3–2 West Germany
 Finland 2–1 Soviet Union

11th place game
February 23
 France 7–6(SO) Norway

9th place game
February 23
 Austria 3–2 Poland

7th place game
February 25
 United States 8–4 Switzerland

Statistics

Average age
Team Germany was the oldest team in the tournament, averaging 28 years and 1 months. Team USA was the youngest team in the tournament, averaging 22 years and 4 months. Gold medalists team USSR averaged 26 years. Tournament average was 26 years and 1 months.

Leading scorers

Final ranking

See also
Calgary Cup

References

 Works cited

External links

Jeux Olympiques 1988

 
1988 Winter Olympics events
Olympics, Winter
1988
Ice hockey competitions in Calgary
1988
World